Prunus brachypetala is a species of bush cherry native to Turkey, Iraq and Iran. Its fruit are edible and consumed locally.

Footnote

References

brachypetala
brachypetala
Flora of Iran
Flora of Iraq
Flora of Turkey
Plants described in 1848
Taxa named by Pierre Edmond Boissier
Taxa named by Wilhelm Gerhard Walpers